The Football League play-offs for the 2015–16 season  (referred to as the Sky Bet Play-Offs for sponsorship reasons) were held in May 2016 with all finals being staged at Wembley Stadium in London.

The play-offs begin at the semi-final stage with all semi-finals being played over two legs, contested by the teams who finished in 3rd, 4th, 5th and 6th place in the Football League Championship and League One and the 4th, 5th, 6th and 7th-placed teams in the League Two table. The winners of the semi-finals then advance to the finals, with the winner of the final gaining promotion for the following season.

Background
The Football League play-offs have been held every year since 1987. They take place for each division following the conclusion of the regular season and are contested by the four clubs finishing below the automatic promotion places.

Championship

Semi-finals
First leg

Second leg

Sheffield Wednesday won 3–1 on aggregate.

Hull City won 3–2 on aggregate.

Final

League One

Semi-finals
First leg

Second leg

Barnsley won 6–1 on aggregate.

Millwall won 4–2 on aggregate.

Final

League Two

Semi-finals
First leg

Second leg

Plymouth Argyle won 3–2 on aggregate.

AFC Wimbledon won 3–2 on aggregate.

Final

References

 
Play-offs
English Football League play-offs
May 2016 sports events in the United Kingdom